Harriet Putnam Fowler (July 25, 1842 – July 28, 1901) was an American author and poet. Her many publications were chiefly in the genealogical and historical line. She created nearly 20 large manuscript volumes of family histories, which she presented to the Essex Institute, Salem, Massachusetts. She also compiled several memorial volumes, wrote numerous poems, and published several small volumes.

Biography
Harriet Putnam Fowler was born July 25, 1842, in Danversport, Massachusetts. Her parents were Samuel and Harriet (Putnam) Page. She had two older siblings, Clara (b. 1836) and Samuel (b. 1838). Fowler was a member of the Putnam family, who were descendents of John Putnam who settled in Salem, Massachusetts in 1634. Fowler also traced her descent through sixteen generations to Catherine Chaucer, sister of Geoffrey Chaucer, the poet.

In 1879, she published a work entitled Vegetarianism, the Radical Cure for Intemperance. Next, she published a novel entitled Our Smoking Husbands and What to Do With Them (New York, The Authors' Pub. Co., c. 1879)). Later, she collated a series of ancestral books of genealogy and heraldry. She was the author of a book of poems entitled Puritan Bluebells, and like her mother, contributed poems to papers. Fowler also published short stories.

Although Fowler lived with a disability for 40 years as a result of an injury from an accident, her final illness was of less than a week's duration. She died at her home in Danvers, Massachusetts, July 28, 1901. Her memoir was incomplete at the time of her death.

Putnam family cupboard

Fowler donated the Putnam cupboard of English oak and cedar to the Essex Institute. Her ancestor, John Putnam, imported it probably about the middle of the 17th century, as the chest of drawers which forms its lower part was not developed earlier, nor were the geometrical patterns of the cedar mouldings used in combination with the split balusters upon the pilasters, until that date. Upon its back are marks of a fire from which the cupboard was rescued when, some two centuries ago, the Putnams' house was destroyed. Certain vase finials which surmounted the posts, 'improvements' suggested by the taste of an 18th-century member of the family, were removed. The enclosed box settle with lifting lid in the Bulkeley Collection is almost unique among examples of colonial woodwork; when discovered in a stable at Barrington, Massachusetts it had for many years been used to hold salt for cattle. It illustrates the earliest of the English modes of combining the chest and the table which produced the settle. The panelled framing of the seat indicates that cushions were intended. The usual type of earlier colonial settle more nearly resembled the high-back variety one finds in old village inns in this country. They were drawn in front of the fire upon a winter's night—especially when of curved shape, as in some old English inns until recent days—for the sake of light as well as warmth, in those days when the flicker of the Betty lamp, shown in the art work as an example, was the sole other illumination.

Selected works

 Vegetarianism, the Radical Cure for Intemperance, 1879
 Our Smoking Husbands and What to Do With Them, c. 1879
 My sleeping father's lovers, 1888
 Puritan Bluebells

Notes

References

Attribution

External links
 
 Putnam Family Cupboard, 1680 at the Peabody Essex Museum

1842 births
1901 deaths
People from Danvers, Massachusetts
Writers from Massachusetts
19th-century American women writers
19th-century American poets
19th-century American novelists
19th-century American short story writers
American people with disabilities